Maitansine (INN), or maytansine (USAN), is a cytotoxic agent. It inhibits the assembly of microtubules by binding to tubulin at the rhizoxin binding site.

It is a macrolide of the ansamycin type and can be isolated from plants of the genus Maytenus.

Maytansinoids
Derivatives of maitansine are known as maytansinoids.
Some are being investigated as the cytotoxic component of antibody-drug conjugates for cancer treatment, and the antibody-drug conjugate trastuzumab emtansine is an approved drug for the treatment of certain kinds of breast cancer in the EU and in the US.

Examples of maytansinoids are:
Ansamitocin
Mertansine / emtansine (DM1)
Ravtansine / soravtansine (DM4)

See also
 ImmunoGen, developer of maytansinoid based drugs

References

Ansamycins
Epoxides
Halogen-containing natural products
Lactams
Chlorobenzenes
Acetamides
Microtubule inhibitors
Carbamates
Plant toxins